Azam Tariq or Rais Khan (died 25 September 2016) was a spokesperson for the Tehrik-i-Taliban Pakistan (TTP) and the fourth-highest ranking commander in the group. The TTP chose him as its spokesman after his predecessor, Maulvi Umar, who was detained by Pakistani authorities in August 2009.

For his first act as spokesman, he claimed responsibility on behalf of the TTP for a suicide bombing at a security checkpoint along the Pakistan-Afghan border near Torkham on August 27, 2009.  Tariq said by telephone that the attack was the first in retaliation for the death of Baitullah Mehsud, the militant group's first leader.  Although the exact number of casualties was unknown, a doctor at a nearby hospital told Dawn News that they had received 22 bodies and local people working at the blast site said they had retrieved 13 bodies.

In August 2010 Tariq referred to the presence of foreign aid organizations providing relief in response to massive flooding as "unacceptable."

He had a 20 million rupee (US$190,740) bounty on his head.

In May 2014, he and other militants based in South Waziristan split from the main TTP and formed their own faction led by Khan Said Sajna. On 25 September 2016, Pakistani security sources stated that Tariq and his son, Shafiullah had been killed along with two other TTP leaders in airstrikes carried out by Afghan forces and NATO in Barmal District, Paktia Province of Afghanistan. His death along with that of his son was confirmed by Zeeshan Haider Mehsud, advisor to TTP's Khan Said Sajna faction.

References

External links 
 

Tehrik-i-Taliban Pakistan members
Pashtun people
Tehrik-i-Taliban Pakistan
Taliban spokespersons
Year of birth missing (living people)